Howard M. Beaty Jr. is a banker and state legislator in Arkansas. He serves in the Arkansas House of Representatives, representing the 9th District. Beaty lives in Crossett, Arkansas. He is a Republican.

References

Year of birth missing (living people)
21st-century American businesspeople
21st-century American politicians
American bankers
 Businesspeople from  Arkansas
Living people
People from Crossett, Arkansas
Republican Party members of the Arkansas House of Representatives